The Bristol Harbour Festival is a festival held annually in the English city of Bristol, and which the celebrates the city's maritime heritage and the importance of Bristol's docks and harbour. Most of the activities, including live music, street performances, fireworks and a variety of other live entertainments, are held on or near the waterfront of Bristol Harbour. Venues include Queen Square, Lloyds Amphitheatre, Millennium Square and Castle Park, with seagoing vessels moored nearby. The liveliest part of the festival is quayside, but the main attractions are entertainment designed to engage all the communities of Bristol, as well as entertain the thousands of visitors to the city.

The city has hosted the festival since 1971, when it was started as part of an, ultimately successful, attempt to save the docks from being filled in. In 2012, the festival attracted over 300,000 visitors, its highest ever attendance, with the Irene and the Matthew being two of the tall ships to attend that year. In 2013 fireworks returned to the festival after a two-year hiatus.

The festival is typically held over a weekend at the end of July or beginning of August. In 2016, it was held on Friday 15 to Sunday 17 July. In 2018 it is scheduled to take place on Friday 20th to Sunday 22 July.

Entertainment

The Bristol Harbour Festival has a variety of entertainment from dance acts, interactive theatre, international circus acts and a mix of musicians. The Dance Village, programmed by Swindon Dance, features a main stage and participation area where visitors can learn to dance.
Cirque Bijou's famous circus stage takes over Castle Park, next to an interactive Children's Area, which featured a pirate ship in 2013. SS Great Britain hosts an outdoor stage with BBC Radio Bristol, while Happy City creates an interactive area within Lloyds Amphitheatre to demonstrate all the elements which make up a happy life. In 2013 the Thekla Harbour Stage was created in Muddock to showcase up and coming bands alongside a new festival bandstand.

In previous years entertainment has included Beth Rowley, the Hot 8 Brass Band, DJ Derek, The Blessing, The Bristol Ambling Band, Phantom Limb, Kid Carpet, Natty, Barry Adamson and VV Brown.

References

External links
 Harbour Festival official website
 About the Harbour Festival at Visit Bristol

Culture in Bristol
Festivals in Bristol
Bristol Harbourside